Hindaun City is a city in Hindaun Block, Karauli district of the Indian state of Rajasthan in Northern India.

It may also refer to:

Rajasthan, India
Hindaun Block, a block in Karauli district of the Indian state of Rajasthan in Northern India
Hindaun City railway station, railway station in the Rajasthan city of Hindaun
Hindaun City bus depot, bus depot in the Rajasthan city of Hindaun
Hindaun (Rajasthan Assembly constituency), one of the constituencies of the Rajasthan Legislative Assembly in the Karauli-Dholpur (Lok Sabha constituency)